Henry "Junjo" Lawes (1960 in Kingston, Jamaica – 14 June 1999 in London, England) was a highly influential Jamaican record producer and a sound engineer.

Biography
Born in the Waterhouse district of Kingston, Jamaica, Lawes began working as a producer in the late 1970s. He worked with many reggae, dancehall and dub artists such as Linval Thompson, Scientist, Toyan, Barrington Levy, Don Carlos, Frankie Paul and most importantly with Yellowman, all for his record label Volcano, which spawned a highly popular sound system of the same name. He used the Roots Radics as his regular studio band.

Lawes served a prison term in the United States after being convicted of drug-related charges in the mid-1980s.

He later worked with Beenie Man and Ninjaman.

On 14 June 1999, he was shot dead in a drive-by shooting in Harlesden, northwest London. The case remains unsolved.

See also
List of Jamaican record producers

References

External links
[ Biography] at Allmusic website

Jamaican record producers
1960 births
1999 deaths
People from Kingston, Jamaica
Jamaican reggae musicians
Deaths by firearm in London
People murdered in London
Greensleeves Records artists
Trojan Records artists